Lissonoschema is a genus of beetles in the family Cerambycidae, containing the following species:

 Lissonoschema fasciatum (Fisher, 1944)
 Lissonoschema macrocolum Martins & Monné, 1978
 Lissonoschema solangeae Monné & Monné, 2000

References

Trachyderini
Cerambycidae genera